iMurders is a 2008 horror film starring Gabrielle Anwar, William Forsythe, and Billy Dee Williams.

Plot
When the participants of an internet chat room are brutally murdered in succession, one person's past holds the key to the gruesome mystery.

Cast

Production
Filming took place in various New Jersey locations and some photography took place in Beverly Hills & Hollywood. It was released under the tagline "You don't know who you're talking to..."

References

External links
 
 
 

2008 films
Films scored by Harry Manfredini
Films about computing
Films shot in Los Angeles
Films shot in New Jersey
Films shot in New York (state)
2008 horror films
2000s English-language films